Saling is an unincorporated community in Audrain County, in the U.S. state of Missouri.

History
A post office called Saling was established in 1884, and remained in operation until 1904. The community takes its name from Saling Township.

References

Unincorporated communities in Audrain County, Missouri
Unincorporated communities in Missouri